Peter Mitchell  (January 4, 1824 – October 25, 1899) was a Canadian politician and one of the Fathers of Confederation.

Family
In 1853, he married Mrs. Gough, a widow of St. John, New Brunswick; she died in 1889.  His nephew was Charles R. Mitchell a former provincial Cabinet Minister and leader of the Alberta Liberal Party.

Life
He was born of Scottish parents at Newcastle in the county of Northumberland, New Brunswick, on January 4, 1824.  He was educated at the Quebec grammar school; he studied law and was called to the bar of the province of New Brunswick in 1848.  He practised his profession for five years and then entered into a partnership with a Mr. Hawe in the business of lumbering and shipbuilding. 

Mitchell ran again in 1856 as an opponent of Prohibition, which had been proposed by the government. He carried a pistol for protection during the campaign and rum for his supporters. He was successful in this election. In the legislature, Mitchell opposed denominational schools and supported the creation of municipal government. He became a member of the Executive Council in 1859, and introduced the colony's first bankruptcy act in order to make things easier for debtors. 
Mitchell did not run for re-election in 1861, but was soon appointed to the Legislative Council of New Brunswick (the colony's upper house) and rejoined the Executive Council.

While attending the Quebec Conference of 1864, Peter Mitchell was a strong supporter of Canadian Confederation. He resigned from the Executive Council in 1865 when the pro-Confederation government of Samuel Leonard Tilley was defeated, and helped lieutenant-governor Arthur Hamilton Gordon force the resignation of the anti-Confederation government of Albert James Smith in 1866. Gordon appointed Mitchell as the new premier. Mitchell asked Gordon to call an election, and he and his Confederation Party were returned with a majority that approved the participation of the colony in the Canadian Confederation in 1867. 

Mitchell attended the London Conference, which drafted the British North America Act. He was appointed to the new Senate of Canada for its inaugural session in July 1867. Mitchell became a member of Sir John A. Macdonald's first cabinet as minister of marine and fisheries. He was an aggressive defender of Canadian interests, and contested foreign fishing in Canadian waters to the extent of using gunboats to seize American vessels. 

Mitchell resigned from the Senate in 1872 to run for a seat in the House of Commons of Canada where he felt he would have more influence. He was acclaimed in a by-election, but in 1873 the Macdonald government fell due to the Pacific Scandal. Mitchell abandoned the Liberal-Conservative Party of Macdonald and declared himself an independent Member of Parliament (MP). He had little influence as an independent and was distrusted by both Conservatives and Liberals.

Mitchell resigned his seat in 1878 after being accused of violating the Independence of Parliament Act by leasing a building to the government while he was a senator. He re-offered in the subsequent by-election and was returned to parliament.

He ran in the 1878 federal election as an "Independent Liberal" who supported Macdonald's National Policy. Mitchell was defeated by independent candidate Jabez Bunting Snowball.

Mitchell returned to the Commons in the 1882 election and was re-elected in the 1887 election as an independent Liberal, but was defeated in the 1891 election.

In 1885, Mitchell purchased the Montreal Herald and Daily Commercial Gazette, and used it to attack the policies of both Liberals and Conservatives. He also called for mercy for Louis Riel, and blamed Macdonald for causing the Riel Rebellion by not dealing with Métis complaints.  
He became a supporter of Sir Wilfrid Laurier and ran as a Liberal in the 1896 election but lost.  
Laurier made him general inspector of fisheries for Quebec and the Maritime provinces, and Mitchell held that position until his death in 1899.

In July 1899, as he was leaving the parliamentary buildings, Ottawa, he was stricken by paralysis. He seemed to recover, but on 25 October 1899, he was found dead in his rooms in the Windsor Hotel, Montreal.

Electoral record

References

Attribution

1824 births
1899 deaths
 
Fathers of Confederation
Canadian Presbyterians
Conservative Party of Canada (1867–1942) senators
Independent MPs in the Canadian House of Commons
Independent Liberal MPs in Canada
Members of the House of Commons of Canada from New Brunswick
Members of the King's Privy Council for Canada
Premiers of New Brunswick
People from Miramichi, New Brunswick
Persons of National Historic Significance (Canada)
Canadian senators from New Brunswick
Colony of New Brunswick people